Henry Nehrling (May 9, 1853 – November 22, 1929) was an American ornithologist and horticulturist.

Life 
Nehrling was born in the town of Herman, near Howards Grove, Sheboygan County, Wisconsin. His father was Carl Nehrling and his mother was Elizabeth Ruge. His early education he received from his mother and his grandfather and he was later sent to a Lutheran parochial school located several miles from his home. His daily walks winter and summer to and from school, through then the primeval forest, familiarized him with every aspect of nature and helped to develop the passionate love for the outdoors, the birds and flowers, that characterized his entire life.  He then learned the haunts of the wild things of the woods and the fields, where the Wild Pigeons roosted, where the Grouse had its drumming log and where grew the rarer plants.

From 1869 to 1873 he attended the State Normal School at Addison, Illinois, and upon graduation became a teacher in the Lutheran schools, a position which he held until 1887, teaching at various places in Illinois, Missouri and Texas.  It has been said that he looked upon his teaching mainly as an instrument by means of which he could carry on his studies of ornithology and the changes from one locality added constantly to the breadth of his knowledge to bird life.

Milwaukee 
In 1887 Nehrling was made the deputy collector and inspector of customs at the port of Milwaukee a position he held until 1890 when he was appointed secretary and custodian of the Public Museum of Milwaukee, a post evidently much more to his liking. During his connection with the museum a former member of his staff states that "he made many important additions to the collections and laid the foundation for the future greatness and educating usefulness of this well known institution". Unfortunately owing to politics Nehrling lost his position in 1903 after twelve years of service.

Florida 
Prior to his retirement, Nehrling had become interested in Florida and bought land in Gotha in 1884, and maintained a garden there, naming it Palm Cottage Gardens. At Palm Cottage Nehrling experimented with over three thousand species of plants, trees, shrubs and vines. Three hundred of those became staples in the landscape of Florida. After a freeze in 1917 killed most of his plants, he relocated to Naples, Florida and started a new garden there. Nehrling named his second garden, H. Nehrling's Tropical Garden and Arboretum.  At Naples Nehrling carried on his work, he grew, hybridized, and popularized many exotic plants for the general public. Caladiums, palms, bamboo and Hippeastrums (the latter commonly and erroneously referred to as 'amaryllis') were all introduced to the United States by way of his Palm Cottage Gardens. He established a strong friendship with Theodore Luqueer Mead of nearby Oviedo, Florida and they collaborated on many plant experiments.

Nehrling died on November 22, 1929, and was laid to rest in the Gotha Cemetery. His Naples garden was preserved as the Jungle Larry's Caribbean Gardens, now the Naples Zoo.

In 2009, The Henry Nehrling Society, purchased Nehrling's home and gardens in Gotha.

Works
 Die Nordamerikanische Vogelwelt (1891) (The World of North-American Birds)

References

External links 

 The Henry Nehrling Society
 Naples Zoo
 "While We Are Hausbound" — American Birds - article on Nehrling

1853 births
1929 deaths
American botanists
American horticulturists
People from Orange County, Florida
Scientists from Milwaukee
People from Herman, Sheboygan County, Wisconsin